The Communist Party of Britain (CPB) is a communist party in Great Britain which emerged from a dispute between Eurocommunists and Marxist-Leninists in the Communist Party of Great Britain in 1988. It follows Marxist-Leninist theory and supports what it regards as existing socialist states, and has fraternal relationships with the ruling parties in Cuba, China, Laos, and Vietnam. It is affiliated nationally to the Cuba Solidarity Campaign and the Venezuela Solidarity Campaign. It is a member of the International Meeting of Communist and Workers' Parties, together with 117 other political parties. After the fall of the Soviet Union, the party was one of two original British signatories to the Pyongyang Declaration.

History

The Communist Party of Britain was (re-)established in April 1988 by a disaffected section of the Communist Party of Great Britain (CPGB). This section sought to preserve the Communist Party, saving it from its forthcoming dissolution under a revisionist, Eurocommunist leadership.

Origins

In the period leading up to 1988, the Communist Party of Great Britain was in turmoil as the leadership fought the Marxist-Leninist tendencies inside the party. The rupture was made publicly visible in August 1982 when the CPGB-affiliated Morning Star newspaper published criticisms of the CPGB's theoretical journal Marxism Today. Both publications came to characterise separate visions for the future of the party; the internal opposition rallied around the Morning Star and the reformist leadership around Marxism Today. These early signs of trouble attracted international attention, notably from the East German SED which was concerned about the Eurocommunist tendency in the CPGB.

At the CPGB's 38th congress in November 1983, Tony Chater the editor of the Morning Star, as well as the assistant editor David Whitfield, were both removed from their positions on the party's executive. However, they were able to keep their positions at the paper, as it is owned and managed separately by the People's Press Printing Society co-operative. The following year at the PPPS Annual General Meeting in June 1984, a majority of delegates re-elected Chater and Whitfield to the management committee of the newspaper, against the wishes of the CPGB leadership. In November 1984, the North-West District Congress elected an opposition majority to its District Committee, to which the leadership responded by declaring the district election illegitimate. A similar movement was brewing in London, where the CPGB General Secretary Gordon McLennan pre-emptively dissolved the London District Congress and 11 members of the District Committee were suspended. In Scotland, 20 branches were brought under disciplinary sanctions. The CPGB Executive Committee then brought the dispute to a special congress on 18–20 May 1985, with a draft resolution condemning the Morning Star and the group around it. Over 650 amendments were submitted to the resolution, which was eventually passed after a long debate, and followed up by the expulsion of eighteen members.

In June 1985, dissident and expelled members of the CPGB formed the Communist Campaign Group. This group declared itself loyal to the party programme, and stated its aim was to prevent the liquidation of the party. The Campaign Group was provided an office within the premises of the Morning Star. The first post-congress meeting of the new CPGB Executive Committee in July 1985 dropped the commitment for party members to support the Morning Star; it concluded with the dissolution of more branches and further disciplinary measures, such as the expulsion of Ken Gill.

For two years, the Campaign Group organised within the CPGB to defend the party's Marxist-Leninist principles. However, at the 1987 party congress the Campaign Group failed to shift the leadership, and the direction of the CPGB diverted towards transformation into a social-democratic party. Kevin Halpin was invited to Moscow to discuss the possibility that the CPGB would break apart, he was advised by the CPSU that the Campaign Group should continue working within the existing party structures. On 8 January 1988 the Campaign Group called a press conference to announce the formation of the Communist Party. The re-establishment congress took place over the weekend of 23–24 April 1988, where one of the prominent leaders of the Campaign Group, Mike Hicks, was elected to the position of General Secretary. Chater emphasised the continuity with the CPGB at the congress, explaining at the time:

The first party card was issued to Andrew Rothstein, who had also been one of the founding members of the CPGB. The following year the leaders of the CPGB formally declared that they had abandoned its programme, The British Road to Socialism. Many members perceived this as the party turning its back on socialism. The CPGB dissolved itself in 1991 and reformed as the Democratic Left. Many members of the Straight Left faction who had stayed in the CPGB formed a group called "Communist Liaison" which later opted to join the CPB. Others remained in the Democratic Left or joined the Labour Party.

The party still has members who were active in the CPGB, some of whom were active in the Anti-Apartheid Movement and trade union disputes such as the Upper Clyde work-in or the miners' strike of 1984–1985.

Since 1998 
In 1998, Hicks was ousted as such in a 17–13 vote moved by John Haylett (who was also editor of the Morning Star) at a meeting of the party's executive committee. Hicks' supporters on the Management Committee of the Morning Star responded by suspending and then sacking Haylett, which led to a prolonged strike at the Morning Star, ending in victory for Haylett and his reinstatement. Some of Hicks' supporters were expelled and others resigned in protest. They formed a discussion group called Marxist Forum, which is now defunct.

The party is part of the Stop the War Coalition; the movement's chair, Andrew Murray was a Communist Party member until late 2016. Prior to the formation of the Respect – The Unity Coalition, with the support of the Socialist Workers Party, the party engaged in a debate about whether to join an electoral alliance with Respect and George Galloway. Those in favour, including general secretary Rob Griffiths, Andrew Murray and Morning Star editor John Haylett, were, however, defeated at a Special Congress in 2004.

In 2009, the party was one of the founder organisations of the No2EU electoral alliance alongside the RMT and a number of other left parties. The alliance stood in the 2009 and 2014 European Parliament elections on a platform of opposition to the European Union, which it considers undemocratic and neo-liberal. Later the party went on to lead a Left Leave Campaign (which was chaired by the party’s General Secretary Robert Griffiths) along with the Socialist Workers Party, advocating the progressive case for a leave vote in the 2016 referendum on EU membership.

The party was a founding member of the People's Assembly Against Austerity in 2013, along with a number of other political and campaign groups, to create a broad organisation in opposition to austerity policies of the major political parties of Britain and of the European Union. The People's Charter, which the Communist Party had helped create several years earlier, was subsequently voted to be incorporated into the People's Assembly.

At the 2017 general election, the party fielded no candidates and gave its support to the Labour Party under the leadership of Jeremy Corbyn. The CPB said it was the first election at which neither it nor the CPGB had fielded any candidates. In March 2018, Susan Michie, a leading member of the CPB, said that the party would no longer stand against Labour in general elections. CPB members should be "working full tilt" for the election of Corbyn as prime minister, she said. In the 2019 general election, the party again fielded no candidates and gave its support to the Labour Party.

However following the resignation of Corbyn as leader of the Labour Party and the election of Keir Starmer as his successor, the CPB again decided to field candidates in elections. In February 2021 the party's executive committee decided to mount one of the biggest electoral campaigns since the early 1980s.

In 2021 the party contested parliamentary seats in the Scottish parliamentary election, all regional lists in the Welsh Senedd election and seats across England in the May local elections.

Ideology

The party's ideology is Marxism–Leninism. It is anti-imperialist, anti-capitalist and pro-trade union. Its programme is called Britain's Road to Socialism.

Attitudes towards capitalism 
The party takes the traditional Marxist approach to capitalism, saying that it is at fault for wars, climate change, and corruption. It claims that 'capitalism must be overthrown in the interests of the working class and humanity.'

Attitudes towards imperialism 
The party believes that the First World War was a war between imperialists, caused by competition between monopolies.

They criticise US imperialism, and US involvement in regime change. They also hold that the World Trade Organization, World Bank, International Monetary Fund and European Union work to push a neoliberal, imperialist agenda.

Capitalism and inequality 
The party claims that inequality in the UK can be traced back to capitalism, with workers providing the country with goods and not being properly paid for it, with workers' pay coming under pressure in the recent decades.

Attitudes towards socialist states

Soviet Union 
The party's attitude towards the Soviet Union was positive, however, it criticises Nikolai Yezhov's actions during the late 1930s as 'violations of socialist democracy'. The final assessment of the Soviet Union is summed up in Britain's Road to Socialism:

North Korea 
The Communist Party of Britain and Workers' Party of Korea are both members of the International Meeting of Communist and Workers' Parties, and so have positive relations. Thus, the Young Communist League has fraternal relations with the Socialist Patriotic Youth League. Challenge, the magazine of the YCL, have published articles in support of the DPRK.

Organisation
The Communist Party describes itself as a "disciplined and democratic organisation" and operates on a model of democratic centralism.

The basic party body is the branch. These are normally localities (towns or counties, for example), although workplace branches also exist. In England, branches are grouped into coherent geographical areas and send delegates to a biennial District Congress which elects a District Committee for its area. Similarly, the Welsh and Scottish branches send delegates to their own national congresses where each elects an executive committee. These congresses also decide the broad perspectives for party activity within their districts and nations.

The all-Britain national congress is also held biennially. Delegates from districts, nations and branches themselves decide the party's policy as a whole and elect an executive committee (EC) that carries out a presidium-like function, including decision-making and policy-formation whilst congress is not in session.

The EC also elects a Political Committee (PC) to provide leadership when the EC is not meeting. Advisory Committees also exist to provide in-depth information on an array of subjects, including committees dedicated to women, industrial workers, pensions, public services, education workers, economics, housing, rails, science technology and the environment, transport, Marxist-Leninist education, LGBT rights, anti-racism, anti-fascism, civil service and international affairs.

Young Communist League

The YCL is the autonomous youth group of the Communist Party, with its own internal organisation. It carries out work alongside the party, while maintaining its own branches, activities, and events such as an annual summer camp. Young members of the party are automatically enrolled into the youth wing, however membership of both organisations is not synonymous, as it is possible to independently join the YCL without joining the party. The league, like its party, operates on a model of democratic centralism.

Coordinating Committee of Communist Parties in Britain
The CCPiB is a bureau within the Communist Party which meets with overseas communist parties that have significant memberships in Britain.

These include:
 Communist Party of India (Marxist)
 Communist Party of Bangladesh
 Communist Party of Chile
 Iraqi Communist Party
 Sudanese Communist Party
 Cypriot Progressive Party of Working People  
 Tudeh Party of Iran 
 Communist Party of Greece

The Committee meets regularly to exchange political assessments, to organise joint theoretical discussions and to plan events of international commemoration.

Electoral information

General election results

At the 1997 general election, the party ran five candidates whose combined vote came to 911. At the 2001 general election, the party ran six candidates whose combined vote came to 1,003.

In 2005, the party fielded six candidates whose combined vote came to 1,124.

In 2010, the party fielded six candidates whose combined vote came to 947; it also supported John Metcalfe and Avtar Sadiq who stood as part of electoral alliances. Metcalfe stood on behalf of the Trade Unionist and Socialist Coalition in Carlisle and won 365 votes, or 0.9% of the total vote. Sadiq stood on behalf of Unity for Peace and Socialism in Leicester East and won 494 votes, or 1% of the total vote. Unity for Peace and Socialism is a domestic alliance between British domiciled sections of the Communist Party of India (Marxist) of which Sadiq was a member, the Communist Party of Bangladesh and the Communist Party of Greece.

In 2015 the party fielded 9 candidates, whose combined vote came to 1,229. Laura-Jane Rossington stood for the party in Plymouth Sutton and Devonport; at just over 18, she was the youngest candidate to stand in the general election in England.

In the 2017 general election, the party fielded no candidates.

Other election results
The party runs candidates in elections on the local, national and European level.

In local elections in 2008 the party gained one councillor, Clive Griffiths, a former Labour councillor who joined the party and was re-elected unopposed to Hirwaun and Penderyn Community Council as a communist.

In the 2009 and 2014 European Parliament elections the party supported the No2EU alliance led by the RMT union. The party also ran in the Welsh Assembly elections in 2007 and 2011. In the 2011 Scottish Parliament election the party stood Marc Livingstone as a candidate.

In April 2019, the party called for a "People's Boycott" of the 2019 European Parliament election in the United Kingdom, which was the first time in its history that the CPB had called for a boycott of an election in Britain.

The party stood candidates in the 2022 local elections.

Symbolism on ballot slips 
Under the Registration of Political Parties Act 1998, which regulated the use of symbols on ballot slips and electoral material, the Communist Party is the only British political party entitled to use a stand-alone hammer and sickle in such cases. The party tends to use the hammer and dove (adopted when the party was re-established in 1988) in conjunction with the hammer and sickle in publications and on other material, with the hammer and dove normally taking primacy.

Membership 
Former members include Bob Crow of the RMT union, Ken Gill of the Manufacturing, Science and Finance (MSF) union and Kate Hudson of the Campaign for Nuclear Disarmament (CND).  Current members include Susan Michie, a member of the UK Government's Scientific Advisory Group for Emergencies and Independent SAGE advising on behavioural science measures during the COVID-19 pandemic.

Size 
From 2006 to 2014 the party held a membership of over 900 members. In 2015 this figure dropped significantly to below 800 members, although it has since recovered with significant growth in the Young Communist League.  At the 56th party congress it was reported that the party had grown to over 1.200 members. As of 2022, the party maintains branches in most major cities. General Secretary Robert Griffiths says that CPB is organised in 'just about every part of Britain'.

Application 
In order to join the party, applicants must pay a registration fee of £12. After this they will be contacted by a representative of their local branch to arrange an interview. Applicants must be 16 or over.

Publications 
The party publishes a wide variety of literature and material.

 Communist Review
 A theoretical and discussion journal published on a quarterly basis. It takes its name from the old journal published by the CPGB and is edited by Martin Levy. The content of the journal covers book reviews, feature articles, letters and sometimes poetry.

 Challenge
 
 The magazine of the Young Communist League. It mainly covers news, feature articles and political reports. Each issue typically features 'Back 2 Basics', a series which explains the basic foundations of Marxism-Leninism in an accessible way. Occasionally it publishes music, film or video game reviews alongside other light content such as comic strips. It is aimed at young people and so is intended to be easier to read than Communist Review.

 Communist Women
 The bulletin of the Women's Commission, edited by the Women's Officer of the party. It features some content from SISTERS – the quarterly journal of the National Assembly of Women.

 Communist News & Views
 An irregular email bulletin which summarises the party's recent statements, resolutions, reports and policies. It also brings attention to campaigns and events being promoted by the party. The name is a reference to World News & Views – the internal newsletter of the CPGB.

 Country Standard
 A newspaper for rural communities, produced since March 1936. It is run by an editorial collective of Communist and Labour members, environmentalists and trade unionists. The paper supports the Countryside Charter. It is published annually, often to coincide with distribution at the Tolpuddle Martyrs' Festival. Otherwise it appears as an insert in the Morning Star.

 Manifesto Press
 The party publishes books under the Manifesto Press imprint.  it has a total catalogue of 25 titles and also sells 2 titles which are published separately by Hetherington Press. The books cover historical, political and social topics and are edited by Nick Wright. The party maintains another book publisher in Scotland called Praxis Press, which operates out of the Unity Books office in Glasgow.

 Unity! and Solidarity
 Unity! is a short booklet focused around labour issues and often distributed for free at trade union events. Solidarity is a bulletin published by the international department of the party, it covers the party's foreign policy and the activities of the Co-ordinating Committee of Communist Parties in Britain. The editor is Anita Halpin.

In addition to this the party publishes many pamphlets under its own name. The Classics of Communism series are reprints of classic works such as The Communist Manifesto or "Left-Wing" Communism: An Infantile Disorder. The Our History series aims to re-tell 'history from below' and covers historical events from a working class perspective. This series is a continuation of the work of the Communist Party Historians Group The party also publishes congress reports, the party programme, briefing notes and other documents.

Headquarters
At the beginning of November 2004, the party and its youth organisation, the YCL, moved out of its temporary headquarters in Camden, North London after receiving notice to quit because of redevelopment. The building was owned by AKEL, the Cypriot communist party. Ruskin House in Croydon was chosen as the new party headquarters, with its long history in the progressive movement as centre of the Anti-Apartheid Movement and also local Labour Party and co-operative groups. The party rents the top floor of four offices at Ruskin House which also allows it plenty of room to hold its congresses and other important meetings, including an annual industrial cadre school and the Communist University of Britain. In Scotland, the party also makes use of an office in Glasgow.

Conferences and festivals

Congress

The party holds a biennial congress with delegates from districts, nations and branches. The last congress as the Communist Party of Great Britain was the 43rd congress and was held in 1991. The 44th congress, as the Communist Party of Britain, was held in 1997. Since 2000 the congress has been held every two years apart from a special congress held in February 2004. The 29 member governing Executive Committee (EC) of the party is elected at congress.

Events

In November 2004 the party organised Communist University events in Wales and England, these were further developed to form a national three-day event which ran annually from 2005 to 2010. This was accompanied by regional weekend universities in Wales, Scotland and the Midlands. Among the speakers at the Communist University at Ruskin House in November 2006 were Labour MP John McDonnell, RMT general secretary Bob Crow, CND chair Kate Hudson, Communist Party USA vice-president Jarvis Tyner, French Communist Party economist Paul Boccara and Palestine Liberation Organization ambassador Dr Noha Khalef.

21st Century Marxism

In 2011, the national Communist University event was renamed to "21st Century Marxism" and the format was changed slightly from a festival to a conference. The style of the event has changed widely over the years as the organisers experiment with different venues and speakers.

The party's political education strategy also includes trade union and political cadre schools, party-building schools and dayschools.

General secretaries

Notes

References

External links
 CP Britain
 CP Northern
 CP South West and Cornwall
 CP Scotland
 CP Wales

 
Eurosceptic parties in the United Kingdom
Communist parties in the United Kingdom
International Meeting of Communist and Workers Parties